Tough Young Teachers is a British documentary television series that was first broadcast on BBC Three on 9 January 2014. The six graduate teachers featured in the series are Charles Wallendahl (University of Oxford), Chloe Shaw (Royal Holloway, University of London), Claudenia Williams (University of Birmingham), Meryl Noronha (King's College London), Nicholas Church (Imperial College London) and Oliver Beach (University of Birmingham & Cornell University).
The six graduates are assigned to challenging schools within London by the educational charity Teach First. The programme tracks the difficulties that they face and the progress that they make in their first year of teaching.

Episode list

Schools
Archbishop Lanfranc School, Croydon
Crown Woods College, Southeast London
The Harefield Academy, Uxbridge

Reception

Ratings
According to overnight figures, the first two episodes had audience shares of 3.0% and 2.2% respectively. The fourth episode was watched by 683,000 (3.0%).

References

External links
 
 Tough Young Teachers, Radio Times

2014 British television series debuts
2014 British television series endings
2010s British documentary television series
BBC television documentaries
English-language television shows
Television shows set in London
Television series by Sony Pictures Television